Aghjeh Dizaj may refer to:
 Aghjeh Dizaj, Maragheh

See also
 Aghcheh Dizaj (disambiguation)